Elisabeth Murdoch may refer to:

Elisabeth Murdoch (philanthropist) (1909–2012), Australian philanthropist, and mother of media tycoon Rupert Murdoch
Elisabeth Murdoch (businesswoman) (born 1968), Australian businesswoman, daughter of Rupert and granddaughter of Dame Elisabeth

See also
Elisabeth Murdoch College